Below are lists of films produced in Egypt in the 1990s.

List of Egyptian films of 1990
List of Egyptian films of 1991
List of Egyptian films of 1992
List of Egyptian films of 1993
List of Egyptian films of 1994
List of Egyptian films of 1995
List of Egyptian films of 1996
List of Egyptian films of 1997
List of Egyptian films of 1998
List of Egyptian films of 1999

External links
 Egyptian films at the Internet Movie Database

1990s
Egypt